Diane C. Swonk (born April 8, 1962) is an American economic advisor and chief economist at KPMG US.

Early life and education 
Swonk was born in Kalamazoo, Michigan. She studied economics at the University of Michigan, where she obtained a Bachelor's degree in 1984, followed by a master's degree, in 1985. She also holds an MBA in finance from the Booth School of Business at the University of Chicago. She is dyslexic, and has spoken publicly on how she considers this to have affected her work.

Career 
Swonk started her career at the age of 22 when she joined First Chicago Corporation in 1985 as an associate economist, becoming "widely regarded as one of the premier forecasters of the U.S. economy" by the turn of the century. The bank later merged with Banc One Corporation to become Bank One. Swonk rose to become director of Economics and senior vice president, prior to leaving the firm in 2004.

Lodged at a nearby New York Marriott World Trade Center hotel to attend an annual National Association for Business Economics (NABE) conference at the time; her economic focus shifted from pure numeracy following the events of 9/11, as she then ascertained economics to be equally influenced by social as by financial policy. Swonk joined the faculty of Kellstadt Graduate School of Business at DePaul University, as a clinical professor of finance that year.

In November 2004, Swonk was appointed chief economist and senior managing director at Mesirow Financial. She spent 11 years at the firm, before leaving in 2016 to found her private consulting firm, DS Economics, where she serves as CEO.

Swonk was appointed chief economist of Grant Thornton, LLP in January 2018. In July 2022, KPMG US appointed her as its chief economist.

Swonk is a Fellow of the NABE, serving as its president from 1999-2000. Swonk is also a member of the Council on Foreign Relations.

Works 
The Passionate Economist: Finding the Power and Humanity Behind the Numbers (2003)
The Economic Outlook and Undercurrents in the Consumer Credit Market (1997)
The Great Lakes Economy Revisited Federal Reserve Bank of Chicago (1996)

References

External links

21st-century American economists
American women economists
University of Michigan College of Literature, Science, and the Arts alumni
University of Chicago alumni
People from Kalamazoo, Michigan
Living people
1962 births
21st-century American women
Scientists with dyslexia